Cambodian French or French Cambodian may refer to:

Cambodian French (linguistics), the dialect of French spoken in Cambodia
Cambodians in France
Mixed race people of Cambodian and French descent